In mathematics, an implicit surface is a surface in Euclidean space defined by an equation 
  
An implicit surface is the set of zeros of a function of three variables.

The graph of a function is usually described by an equation  and is called an explicit representation. The third essential description of a surface is the parametric one: 
, where the -, - and -coordinates of surface points are represented by three functions  depending on common parameters . Generally the change of representations is simple only when the explicit representation  is given:  (implicit),  (parametric).

Examples:
The plane 
The sphere 
The torus 
A surface of genus 2:  (see diagram).
The surface of revolution  (see diagram wineglass).
For a plane, a sphere, and a torus there exist simple parametric representations. This is not true for the fourth example.

But in general the solution may not be made explicit. This theorem is the key to the computation of essential geometric features of a surface: tangent planes, surface normals, curvatures (see below). But they have an essential drawback: their visualization is difficult.

Example 5 is non-algebraic.

Despite difficulty of visualization, implicit surfaces provide relatively simple techniques to generate theoretically (e.g. Steiner surface) and practically (see below) interesting surfaces.

Formulas 
Throughout the following considerations the implicit surface is represented by an equation
  where function  meets the necessary conditions of differentiability. The partial derivatives of

Tangent plane and normal vector 
.
If the surface point  is not regular, it is called singular.

The equation of the tangent plane at a regular point  is

and a normal vector is

Normal curvature 
In order to keep the formula simple the arguments  are omitted:

 

The proof of this formula relies (as in the case of an implicit curve) on the implicit function theorem and the formula for the normal curvature of a parametric surface.

Applications of implicit surfaces 
As in the case of implicit curves it is an easy task to generate implicit surfaces with desired shapes by applying algebraic operations (addition, multiplication) on simple primitives.

Equipotential surface of point charges 
The electrical potential of a point charge   at point  generates at point  the potential (omitting physical constants)
 
The equipotential surface for the potential value  is the implicit surface   which is a sphere with center at point .

The potential of  point charges is represented by 
 

For the picture the four charges equal 1 and are located at the points 
. The displayed surface is the equipotential surface (implicit surface) .

Constant distance product surface 
A Cassini oval can be defined as the point set for which the product of the distances to two given points is constant (in contrast, for an ellipse the sum is constant). In a similar way implicit surfaces can be defined by a constant distance product to several fixed points.

In the diagram metamorphoses the upper left surface is generated by this rule: With

 

the constant distance product surface   is displayed.

Metamorphoses  of implicit surfaces 
A further simple method to generate new implicit surfaces is called metamorphosis of implicit surfaces:

For two implicit surfaces  (in the diagram: a constant distance product surface and a torus) one defines new surfaces using the design parameter :
 
In the diagram the design parameter is successively  .

Smooth approximations of several implicit surfaces 

-surfaces  can be used to approximate any given smooth and bounded object in  whose surface is defined by a single polynomial as a product of subsidiary polynomials. In other words, we can design any smooth object with a single algebraic surface. Then, the approximating object is defined by the polynomial

where  stands for the blending parameter that controls the approximating error.

Analogously to the smooth approximation with implicit curves, the equation

represents for suitable parameters  smooth approximations of three intersecting tori with equations

 

(In the diagram the parameters are )

Visualization of implicit surfaces 
There are various algorithms for rendering implicit surfaces, including the marching cubes algorithm. Essentially there are two ideas for visualizing an implicit surface: One generates a net of polygons which is visualized (see surface triangulation) and the second relies on ray tracing which determines intersection points of rays with the surface. The intersection points can be approximated by sphere tracing, using a signed distance function to find the distance to the surface.

See also 
 Implicit curve

References

Further reading
Gomes, A., Voiculescu, I., Jorge, J., Wyvill, B., Galbraith, C.: Implicit Curves and Surfaces: Mathematics, Data Structures and Algorithms, 2009, Springer-Verlag London, 
Thorpe: Elementary Topics in Differential Geometry, Springer-Verlag, New York, 1979,

External links 
Sultanow: Implizite Flächen
Hartmann: Geometry and Algorithms for COMPUTER AIDED DESIGN
GEOMVIEW
K3Dsurf: 3d surface generator
SURF: Visualisierung algebraischer Flächen

Surfaces
Computer-aided design
Geometry processing